Prince Heinrich XXXIII Reuss of Köstritz (26 July 1879 – 15 November 1942) was a German aristocrat.

Family and early life
Prince Heinrich XXXIII Reuss was the son of the Prince Heinrich VII Reuss of Köstritz and  Princess Marie Alexandrine of Saxe-Weimar-Eisenach. Through his mother, Prince Heinrich XXXIII was heir to the throne of the Kingdom of the Netherlands until the birth of the Crown Princess Juliana, daughter of Queen Wilhelmina.

Prince Reuss was trained as a doctor, and passed all his medical examinations; he entered the army subsequently and took a commission in the 2nd Dragoon Guards, and afterwards served in the German diplomatic service. It was Prince Reuss before whom the two English doctors, Dr. Elliot and Dr. Austin, who were arrested as spies in Belgium were tried. The question to be decided by the Prince was whether they were doctors or not, and he had to put them through a severe examination in medicine. They were acquitted, and the Prince reportedly said "he thought those two English doctors two of the finest and most honest men he had ever met."

Dutch succession
 
Prince Heinrich XXXIII Reuss was seen as the most probable heir to the Dutch throne in the event that Queen Wilhelmina remained childless.  Thus until 1909 he could be considered as an heir although he had severe competition from the Wied family (Princess Marie zu Wied was a daughter of Prince Frederick of the Netherlands and very popular in the Netherlands).  Prince Heinrich XXXIII was the younger son of Marie Alexandrine (daughter of Princess Sophie of the Netherlands) and Prince Heinrich VII Reuss of Köstritz.

A contemporary report said: "Prince Henry XXXII of Reuss, who is next in order to the Grand Duke of Saxe-Weimar, is said to have no ambition in the direction of the Dutch throne, and to be willing to "renounce" in favour of Prince Henry XXXIII, now employed at the Berlin foreign Office, and until a year ago a member of the German Embassy in Paris.  Early last year Prince Henry XXXIII was the guest of the Queen at The Hague, and was made much of at the Court and in social circles, so that he came to be generally regarded as "first favourite" in the succession.  He is a man of varied talents; as a sculptor and as a painter he has produced ivories which have been accorded favourable criticism."

Marriage
His first marriage was to Princess Victoria Margaret of Prussia, daughter of Prince Friedrich Leopold of Prussia and Princess Louise Sophie of Schleswig-Holstein-Sonderburg-Augustenburg, on 17 May 1913 at Neues Palais, Potsdam, Brandenburg, Germany. They had two children, a daughter Maria Luise (b. 1915) and a son Heinrich (b. 1916). They were divorced on 14 July 1922.

He next married the wealthy American Allene Tew on 10 April 1929 in Paris, France. They were divorced on 31 October 1935.

Death
He gained the title of Prinz Reuss zu Köstritz upon his father's death in 1906.

He died on 15 November 1942 at age 63 at Stonsdorf. 

His former wife, Allene Tew, became the guardian of his young son and brought him to America with her and her new husband, Count Paul De Kotzebue, shortly after their marriage in 1936.

Ancestry

References

External links
 
 
 
 

1879 births
1942 deaths
Princes of Reuss